Henrik Nilsson (born 15 February 1976, in Nyköping) is a Swedish sprint canoer who competed from the mid-1990s to the 2010s. Competing in four Summer Olympics, he won two medals in the K-2 1000 m event with a gold in 2004 and a silver in 2000.

Nilsson's first international medal came at the 1997 World Championships in Dartmouth, Canada, where he won the K-2 200 m bronze medal with partner Henrik Andersson.

His greatest triumphs however came with partner Markus Oscarsson. In 2001, they were world championship bronze medalists in K-2 500 m.

Nilsson and Oscarsson then dominated the K-2 1000 m event over the next three years, winning two world championship gold medals, in Seville (2002) and Gainesville, USA (2003), followed by the Olympic gold at Athens 2004.

Nilsson is 190 cm tall (6' 3) and weighs 86 kg (189 lbs).

References 
 
 
 

1976 births
Canoeists at the 1996 Summer Olympics
Canoeists at the 2000 Summer Olympics
Canoeists at the 2004 Summer Olympics
Canoeists at the 2012 Summer Olympics
Living people
Olympic canoeists of Sweden
Olympic gold medalists for Sweden
Olympic silver medalists for Sweden
Swedish male canoeists
Olympic medalists in canoeing
ICF Canoe Sprint World Championships medalists in kayak
Medalists at the 2004 Summer Olympics

Medalists at the 2000 Summer Olympics